The Zimbabwe national cricket team toured New Zealand in February and March 1998 and played a two-match Test series against the New Zealand national cricket team followed by five Limited Overs Internationals (LOI). New Zealand won both Test matches convincingly to take the series 2–0. New Zealand were captained by Stephen Fleming and Zimbabwe by Andy Flower. New Zealand won the LOI series 4–1.

One Day Internationals (ODIs)

1st ODI

2nd ODI

3rd ODI

4th ODI

5th ODI

Test series summary

First Test

Second Test

References

1998 in New Zealand cricket
1998 in Zimbabwean cricket
International cricket competitions from 1997–98 to 2000
New Zealand cricket seasons from 1970–71 to 1999–2000
1997-98